Mary Bryan may refer to:

Mary Bryan (poet) (1780–1838), English Romantic poet and novelist
Mary Edwards Bryan (1846–1913), American journalist and author
Mary Baird Bryan (1861–1930), American suffragette and writer
Mary K. Bryan (1877–1962), American botanist
Mary deGarmo Bryan (1891–1986), American dietitian and professor
Mary Taylor Bryan (1901–1978), American artist
Mary G. Bryan (1910–1964), American archivist
Mary Bryan (badminton) (1935–2017), Irish badminton player
Mary Bryan, a fictional character in an episode of Tales of the Unexpected

See also
Mary Brian (1906–2002), American actress
Mary Bryant (disambiguation)